Ringland Tavern is a historic building in Scenery Hill, Pennsylvania.

It is designated as a historic residential landmark/farmstead by the Washington County History & Landmarks Foundation.

References

External links
[ National Register nomination form]

Hotel buildings on the National Register of Historic Places in Pennsylvania
Federal architecture in Pennsylvania
Houses completed in 1827
Taverns in Pennsylvania
Houses in Washington County, Pennsylvania
National Register of Historic Places in Washington County, Pennsylvania
Drinking establishments on the National Register of Historic Places in Virginia
1827 establishments in Pennsylvania
Individually listed contributing properties to historic districts on the National Register in Pennsylvania